"New Moon on Monday" is the tenth single by the English new wave band Duran Duran, released on 23 January 1984 in the United Kingdom.

The second single to be taken from the band's third studio album Seven and the Ragged Tiger (1983), the song was another success, reaching the top ten on both the UK and US charts. On 11 February 1984, the single reached number nine on the UK Singles Chart and on 17 March, it reached number 10 on the US Billboard Hot 100, after entering on 14 January 1984 at number 56. It did not chart well in Australia and Scandinavia, territories where its predecessor, "Union of the Snake", had been a big hit. This trend was reversed with the next single, "The Reflex", which became a worldwide number-one hit.

Critical reception
In a contemporary review, Cash Box said that the song "follows the surefire hit formula" but "the loneliness-themed tune is more lyrical than usual."

In a retrospective review, "New Moon on Monday" was praised by AllMusic journalist Donald A. Guarisco, who wrote: "The music holds the unusual lyrics together by wedding effervescent verse melodies that bounce high and low to a triumphant-sounding chorus with a rousing feel."

Music video
The music video for "New Moon on Monday" was filmed by director Brian Grant during the morning of 7 December 1983 in the village of Noyers in France. It has a loosely sketched storyline in which the band appear as members of an underground resistance movement called "La Luna" (the name is one of the few connections between the video's content and the song lyrics), organizing a revolt against a modern (1980s-era computers are used) oppressive militaristic regime, apparently in France.

"We set out to make a little movie," recalled Grant. "I'm not sure we succeeded." He was not the first choice to shoot the video, as Russell Mulcahy, director of many of the band's other videos, was unavailable.

Several versions of this video exist. The longest is a 17-minute "movie version" which includes an extended introduction before the song starts (including a scene of dialogue between Simon Le Bon and the story's female lead, played by Patricia Barzyk, winner of the Miss France title in 1980; a brief snippet of "Union of the Snake" is also heard on a radio), and is set to an extended remix of the song. A shorter version, with a spoken French-dialogue intro, was originally submitted to MTV, who then later requested an even shorter version without the prologue.

Yet another version was produced for the video collection Dancing on the Valentine (1984), showing blue-lit scenes of the band members in front of a full-moon backdrop. All but one of the versions were included as easter eggs on the 2004 DVD compilation Greatest.

Both guitarist Andy Taylor and keyboardist Nick Rhodes say that this is the band's least favourite music video. "Everybody ... hates it, particularly the dreadful scene at the end where we all dance together," Taylor wrote in his memoirs. "Even today, I cringe and leave the room if anyone plays [it]." He recalls that they were miserable since their Christmas holiday had been cut short to shoot the video, and spent most of the day on the dark and cold set drinking, to the point that he was "half cut" by the time the last scenes were shot. "It's one of the few times I've seen Nick dance."

B-sides, bonus tracks and remixes
"New Moon on Monday" was backed with a remix of the instrumental "Tiger Tiger" done by Ian Little. The original version of the instrumental was found on the studio album Seven and the Ragged Tiger (1983). The release was rounded out by an extended version of the title track.

Formats and track listing

7": EMI. / DURAN 1 United Kingdom
 "New Moon on Monday"  – 4:16
 "Tiger Tiger" (Ian Little Remix) – 3:28

12": EMI. / 12 DURAN 1 United Kingdom
 "New Moon on Monday" (Dance Mix) – 6:03 (a.k.a. "Extended Version")
 "Tiger Tiger" (Ian Little Remix) – 3:28
 "New Moon on Monday"  – 4:16

 Track 3 not listed on sleeve or labels.

7": Capitol Records. / B-5309 United States 
 "New Moon on Monday"  – 4:16
 "Tiger Tiger" (Ian Little Remix) – 3:28

12": Capitol Records. / SPRO-9060 (Promo) United States 
 "New Moon on Monday"  – 4:16
 "New Moon on Monday"  – 4:16

12": Capitol Records. / SPRO-9080 (Promo) United States 
 "New Moon on Monday" (Dance Mix) – 6:03 
 "New Moon on Monday" (Dance Mix) – 6:03

CD: Part of "Singles Box Set 1981-1985" boxset
 "New Moon on Monday"  – 4:16
 "Tiger Tiger" (Ian Little Remix) – 3:28
 "New Moon on Monday" (Dance Mix) – 6:03 (a.k.a. "Extended Version")

Chart positions

Other appearances
Aside from the single, "New Moon on Monday" appears on:

Albums:
 Seven and the Ragged Tiger (1983)
 Greatest (1998)
 Night Versions: The Essential Duran Duran (1998, US only)
 Strange Behaviour (1999)
 VH1: The Big 80's Pop (2001)
 Singles Box Set 1981–1985 (2003)

Videos:
 Dancing on the Valentine (1984)
 Greatest (1998)
Film:

 Razorback (1984)

Personnel
Duran Duran are:
Simon Le Bon – vocals 
Nick Rhodes – keyboards
John Taylor – bass guitar
Roger Taylor – drums
Andy Taylor – guitar

Other:
Alex Sadkin – producer
Ian Little – producer
Raphael DeJesus – percussion
Mark Kennedy – percussion

References

External links

1983 songs
1984 singles
Duran Duran songs
EMI Records singles
Capitol Records singles
Songs written by Simon Le Bon
Songs written by John Taylor (bass guitarist)
Songs written by Roger Taylor (Duran Duran drummer)
Songs written by Andy Taylor (guitarist)
Songs written by Nick Rhodes